IGE is Internet Gaming Entertainment, an MMORPG services company.

Ige, IGE or Igé may also refer to:

Science
 Immunoglobulin E (IgE), an antibody
 Induced gamma emission, the process of fluorescent emission of gamma rays
 Idiopathic generalized epilepsy, a group of epileptic disorders

Organizations
 IGE Group of Companies, a Myanmar conglomerate
 IGE Resources, former name of Bluelake Mineral AB, a Swedish mining company
 Swiss Federal Institute of Intellectual Property (Eidgenössisches Institut für Geistiges Eigentum)

Places
 Igé, Orne, a commune in Basse-Normandie, France
 Igé, Saône-et-Loire a commune in Bourgogne, France

People
 Bola Ige (1930–2001), Nigerian lawyer
 David Ige (born 1957), American politician
 Kola Ige (born 1985), Nigerian footballer
 Olawale Adeniji Ige (born 1938), Nigerian engineer and politician

Other uses
 Infinite garble extension, a block cipher mode of operation

See also